Witches is a supplement for fantasy role-playing games published by Mayfair Games in 1990.

Contents
Witches is a supplement of rules for a witch character class with nine subclasses: classical witches (from ancient times), faerie witches, dianic (medieval), Golden Dawn (19th century), Wiccan (modern), voodoo, animistic, elemental, and Deryni witches (from the novels of Katherine Kurtz).  Each character type includes background and guidelines for play.

Publication history
Witches was written by Nigel D. Findley, with a cover by Joe de Velasco, and illustrations by Roger Raupp, and was published by Mayfair Games in 1990 as a 96-page book.

Reception

Reviews
 White Wolf Magazine #23 (Oct 1990)

References

Fantasy role-playing game supplements
Role Aids
Role-playing game supplements introduced in 1990